Galactic Melt is the debut studio album by American electronic musician Com Truise, released on June 5, 2011 by the independent record label Ghostly International.

Critical reception

Galactic Melt received generally positive reviews from critics, with a score of 71 out of 100 based on 16 reviews on review aggregator website Metacritic. AllMusic journalist Andy Kellman compared it to the works of Ford & Lopatin in that it "can be enjoyed in one-track doses or complete immersion, and it often inspires YouTube users to upload unofficial videos incorporating fuzzy, dreamlike images from early- to mid-‘80s television and film clips."

Track listing

References

2011 albums
Com Truise albums
Ghostly International albums